Brian Simmons is a former American football player.

Brian Simmons may also refer to:

Brian Simmons (baseball)
Brian Simmons (sound engineer)
Brian Simmons (Canadian football)
Bryan Simmons, radio host on KOST